At. Long. Last. ASAP (stylized as AT.LONG.LAST.A$AP) is the second studio album by American rapper ASAP Rocky. It was released on May 26, 2015, by ASAP Worldwide, Polo Grounds Music, and RCA Records. The record serves as a sequel from Rocky's previous studio effort Long. Live. ASAP (2013). The album's executive production was provided by Danger Mouse, mentor ASAP Yams and Rocky himself, featuring production by Rocky and Danger Mouse, as well as a variety of several high-profile producers, including co-executive producers Hector Delgado and Juicy J, Jim Jonsin, FnZ, Frans Mernick, Kanye West, Thelonious Martin, and Mark Ronson, among others. The album features guest appearances from Bones, Joe Fox, Future, Schoolboy Q, Kanye West, Lil Wayne, and A-Cyde, among others.

At. Long. Last. ASAP was supported by three singles: "Lord Pretty Flacko Jodye 2 (LPFJ2)", "Everyday", and "LSD". The album received generally positive reviews from critics and debuted at number one on the US Billboard 200. It is Rocky's second US number-one album. The album was certified platinum by the Recording Industry Association of America (RIAA).

Background

On March 16, 2014, announcements were made for two releases; including their first instrumental mixtape, Beauty and the Beast: Slowed Down Sessions (Chapter 1), and the ASAP Mob's collaborative album, L.O.R.D. ASAP Rocky revealed that he had been working on his second album. On September 26, 2014, ASAP Mob's founder ASAP Yams announced on his Tumblr account that the group scrapped the release for their collective's album, L.O.R.D., and instead named Rocky's second album as the label's next release. On October 2, 2014, Rocky announced that he signed a contract for worldwide representation with William Morris Endeavor.

On January 18, 2015, ASAP Rocky's mentor and business partner  Yams died at the age of 26, which greatly affected the album's development. Upon ASAP Yams' death, Rocky revealed that his second album would be executive produced by himself and Yams, alongside rapper Juicy J, and record producer Danger Mouse; as well as collaborating with artists such as FKA Twigs and Lykke Li, with production by Clams Casino.

Title
After performing at the 2015's South by Southwest (SXSW) festival, ASAP Rocky revealed to Billboard, that the title to his second album would be A.L.L.A.. On March 26, 2015, in an interview with GQ, Rocky deciphered the album's title: "I'm claiming ownership of my legacy. Look at it: At.Long.Last.A$AP. A-L-L-A. Like slang for 'Allah.' It's the return of the god MC. I'm named after Rakim, and I'm finally facing what it means: I was born to do this shit. And I hope I get to do it for a very long time."

Composition
Upon the release of the song "M's" (stylized "M'$"), Rocky revealed that he had also worked with New York City rapper Mos Def, as well as up-and-coming British musician Joe Fox (who is prominently featured on many tracks on the album). Hector Delgado and Rocky say that they met Joe Fox while roaming the streets of London: "I met the man. He was a street performer. [I met him in] London. I was at Dean's Studio until 4 a.m. I came outside and we waiting for our Uber to go to Starbucks, tired. This kid comes with his guitar and stuff. He was out there playing and stuff and he comes," Rocky explained of his first encounter with Fox. "It was about 4 a.m. so there's nobody in the streets. He tried to give me a CD and shit. I was like, 'I'm not about to listen to that, man. Play something. You got your guitar.' He played it and I was just like, 'Stop man. Come on let's go.' That's where it started."

Release and promotion

On October 2, 2014, ASAP Yams and ASAP Rocky posted links to their website FlackoJodyeSeason.com, and then announced that Rocky's new single would be releasing at midnight. On October 3, Rocky released the album's promotional single, "Multiply" featuring Memphis-based rapper Juicy J. The song was accompanying by the music video (directed by ASAP Rocky and Shomi Patwary), which was officially released at midnight on the website, which had previously displayed a countdown timer. Upon the release, Rocky teased the release of his second studio album, which gave no further details.

On April 8, 2015, a song that was called "M's" debuted during Rocky's interview with the Red Bull Music Academy, and the song was released two days later on the iTunes Store. However, Rocky denounced the song as an official single from the album. The album version includes a re-worked version of the track, replacing Rocky's second verse, with a guest verse from New Orleans-based rapper Lil Wayne. On May 7, Rocky announced that the release date for the album is on June 2, 2015. On May 9, Rocky unveiled the album's cover art on his Instagram page, with the caption "AT LONG LAST...." On the same day, he also released the album's alternative artwork.

On May 25, 2015, the album was leaked online, approximately one week before its expected release. Rocky later tweeted to announce that the album had to be released at midnight, advancing the date to a week early. The album was released to digital retailers on May 26, 2015, by ASAP Worldwide, Polo Grounds Music and RCA Records. On August 30, Rocky performed "M's" and "LSD" at the 2015 MTV Video Music Awards.

Singles
On January 7, 2015, ASAP Rocky released the album's lead single, titled "Lord Pretty Flacko Jodye 2 (LPFJ2)". The song was produced by the duo Nez & Rio. The music video, which was directed by Rocky, was released on February 11, 2015.

On May 8, 2015, Rocky released the album's second single, titled "Everyday". The track features guest appearances from musician Rod Stewart, American R&B recording artist Miguel, and Mark Ronson (who also produced the track as well, alongside Emile Haynie).

On May 19, 2015, Rocky released a music video for "LSD" (stylized "L$D", which stands for Love, $ex, Dream). The song was produced by Hector Delgado, Jim Jonsin and Finatik N Zac. The music video was directed by Dexter Navy. "LSD" was officially released as the album's third single on May 21, via digital distribution.

Critical reception

At. Long. Last. ASAP was met with generally positive reviews. At Metacritic, which assigns a normalized rating out of 100 to reviews from professional publications, the album received an average score of 76, based on 33 reviews. Aggregator AnyDecentMusic? gave it 6.7 out of 10, based on their assessment of the critical consensus.

In The Daily Telegraph, Neil McCormick called it a "big, bold, madly ambitious album" on which Rocky "made a frequently dazzling spectacle, another reminder that hip hop is currently setting the bar very high indeed". Jon Caramanica of The New York Times said the rapper "doesn't absorb and repurpose his guests' styles. He's fully formed, a rapper who understands his talent in relation to that of his peers and that of his influences, unafraid of showing you his blueprint". Alex Denney of NME said, "Playground misogyny aside, ALLA is a thrillingly focused follow-up that betrays its anxieties even as it mostly makes do with extolling the virtues of vice". Jon Dolan from Rolling Stone credited the producers for sustaining the album's "expensive vibe" with "a sound that's at once tough and transporting — from the gospel-steeped 'Holy Ghost' to the interplanetary ass-shaker 'Electric Body' to the Rod Stewart-sampling soul fantasia 'Everyday' (featuring Miguel). Even at his trippiest, Rocky makes sure things never swirl off in a haze of incense and peppermints, with steely lyrics that often focus on inescapable truths". Ben Thomas of The Guardian said, "Some might call it retrograde in the year of To Pimp a Butterfly, but rap is big enough to contain multitudes – including self-regard when it's this perfectly delivered".

Rebecca Haithcoat was less impressed in Spin, highlighting the upbeat production of "LSD", "Excuse Me", and "Westside Highway", but finding the rest of the record often "despondent". Jonathan Hatchman of Clash said, "As a collected body of work At.Long.Last.A$AP is far from dreadful, but taken as a whole it lacks the elements of depth and star quality that—having set the bar incredibly high with his debut—many expect from A$AP Rocky". Mojo reviewer Andy Cowan gave it a lukewarm assessment, writing that while "there are few lyrical miracles in these scattershot songs obsessed with sex, drugs and shopping, in this intuitive stylist's mouth the words themselves are often beside the point". Brooklyn Russell of Pretty Much Amazing said, "Even if we were to give ALLAs abysmal lyrics a pass, the production doesn't help, either.... Still, Rocky can, at times, be an engaging figure that radiates charisma when he wants".

Year-end lists

Commercial performance
At. Long. Last. ASAP debuted at number one on the US Billboard 200 with 146,000 album-equivalent units, of which 117,000 were pure album sales. In conclusion to this, it also gave Rocky his second consecutive number one album on the charts to date. In Canada, the album debuted at number one, with 11,000 copies sold. The album spent two more weeks in the top ten of the Billboard 200. As of July 2015, the album has sold 215,000 copies in the United States.

Additionally, At. Long. Last. ASAP also spent four weeks at number one on the US Top R&B/Hip-Hop Albums from June 13 – July 4, before singer Leon Bridges' debut album, Coming Home, dethroned the album's run at the top slot. Also, as the R&B/Hip-Hop Albums chart's distillation, A.L.L.A. stayed at the top slot on the US Rap Albums chart for a total of five nonconsecutive weeks (between June 13 – July 11), before being dethroned by rapper Meek Mill's second studio album, Dreams Worth More Than Money, which also debuted at number one on the Billboard 200, giving Meek Mill his first number one album to date as well. As of April 2018, the album has been certified platinum by the Recording Industry Association of America (RIAA) for achieving over a million album-equivalent units.

Track listing
Credits adapted from album's liner notes.

Track notes
  indicates a co-producer
  indicates an additional producer
 Every featured artist is separated by an "x" in place of commas and an ampersand
 "LSD" features additional vocals by Joe Fox
 "Electric Body" features additional vocals by Joe Fox, King Kanobby and Theola "Theezy" Borden
 "Westside Highway" features background vocals by Christina Milian
 "M's" features additional vocals by 2 Chainz
 "Everyday" features additional vocals by Yasiin Bey
 "Back Home" features additional vocals by Anthony Pavel

Sample credits
 "Holy Ghost" contains a sample of "Noon as Dark as Midnight", performed by Lucero.
 "Canal St." contains a sample of "Dirt", written and performed by Bones.
 "LSD" contains a sample of "Ode to Billie Joe" (1967), performed by Lou Donaldson.
 "Excuse Me" contains a sample of "Come Home for Christmas" (Incorrectly credited as "I'll Be Home for Christmas"), performed by The Platters. 
 "Electric Body" contains a portion of the composition "Shake That Ass", written by Edwin Perez and David Colquit, and performed by Tapp.
 "Jukebox Joints" contains samples of "Doa Tuk Kekashih", performed by Rasela; "Much Better Off", performed by Smokey Robinson and The Miracles; and "Who Cares", performed by Tony Aiken and Future 2000.
 "Max B" contains samples of "Who by Fire", written and performed by Leonard Cohen; and "Take Me to the Mardi Grass", performed by Bob James.
 "Wavybone" contains samples of "Heaven and Hell", performed by El Michels Affair; and "Could I Be Falling In Love", performed by Syl Johnson.
 "Better Things" contains samples of "Carry On", written and performed by Bobby Caldwell; "All Around and Away We Go", performed by Mr Twin Sister; "High School Lover", performed by Cayucas; and also contains a portion of "How I Could Just Kill a Man", performed by Cypress Hill.
 "Dreams (Interlude)" contains a sample of "Stuck In The Middle", written and performed by Naja Rosa and Anders Holm.
 "Everyday" contains a sample of "In a Broken Dream", performed by Python Lee Jackson and Rod Stewart.
 "Back Home" contains a sample of "Gotta Find My Way Back Home", performed by The Jaggerz.

Personnel
Credits are adapted from AllMusic.

 ASAP Yams – featured artist
 A-Cyde – featured artist, vocals
 Derek "MixedByAli" Ali – mixing
 Angel "Onhel" Apontel – vocals
 Beatriz Artola – assistant, engineer, mixing
 ASAP Rocky – additional production, executive producer, primary artist, producer
 Dan Auerbach – guitar
 Awge – design, executive producer
 Victor Axelrod – keyboards
 Yasiin Bey – vocals
 Jeff Bhasker – additional production
 Bones – featured artist
 Theola Borden – vocals
 Nathan Burgess – assistant
 Michael Burman – guitar
 Austen Jux Chandler – engineer
 Maddox Chhim – assistant
 Da Honorable C.N.O.T.E. – producer
 Riccardo Damian – engineer
 Danger Mouse – additional production, executive producer, producer
 DDot Omen – producer
 Mike Dean – mixing, producer
 Hector Delgado – additional production, arranger, editing, engineer, executive producer, keyboards, mixing, producer, programming
 DJ Khalil – additional production
 Rhys Downing – engineer
 Pablo Dylan – assistant
 Tom Elmhirst – additional production
 Max Ervin – assistant
 James Fauntleroy – featured artist
 FnZ – keyboards, producer, programming
 Joe Fox – featured artist, guitar, vocals
 Future – featured artist
 Dan Fyfe – assistant
 Noah Goldstein – engineer
 Emile Haynie – drum programming, producer
 Hudson Mohawke – additional production
 James Hunt – assistant
 Jaycen Joshua – mixing
 Chace Johnson – executive producer
 Jim Jonsin – keyboards, producer, programming
 Juicy J – executive producer, featured artist, producer
 King Kanobby – vocals
 Ryan Kaul – assistant
 Kennie Takahashi – mixing
 Dave Kutch – mastering
 Michele Lamy – art direction
 Carter Lang – bass
 Bryan Leach – executive producer
 Lil Wayne – featured artist
 Mario Loving – producer
 Thelonious Martin – producer
 Nikolas Marzouca – engineer
 Rakim Mayers – producer
 Frans Mernick – additional production, drum programming, engineer, producer
 M.I.A. – featured artist
 Miguel – engineer, featured artist
 Christina Milan – background vocals
 Will Miller – trumpet
 Todd Monfalcone – assistant, assistant engineer, engineer, mixing assistant
 Mos Def – featured artist
 Dexter Navy – photography
 Anthony Pavel – vocals
 Plu2o Nash – producer
 Che Pope – producer
 Rebel Rock – producer
 Dana Richard – assistant
 Steven "A$AP Yams" Rodriguez – executive producer
 Mark Ronson – bass, drum programming, engineer, featured artist, keyboards, producer
 Matt Schafer – assistant
 Jason Schweitzer – mixing
 S.I.K. – producer
 Jason Staniulis – engineer
 Rod Stewart – featured artist
 THC – additional production
 UGK – featured artist
 Tom Upex – assistant
 Vulkan the Krusader – producer
 Teddy Walton – additional production
 Taheed Watson – assistant, assistant engineer, mixing assistant
 Nesbitt Wesonga – producer
 Kanye West – featured artist, producer
 Kenta Yoneksaka – engineer

Charts

Weekly charts

Year-end charts

Certifications

See also
 List of UK R&B Albums Chart number ones of 2015
 List of Billboard 200 number-one albums of 2015
 List of Billboard number-one R&B/hip-hop albums of 2015

References

External links
 

2015 albums
ASAP Rocky albums
RCA Records albums
Albums produced by Mike Dean (record producer)
Albums produced by Honorable C.N.O.T.E.
Albums produced by Emile Haynie
Albums produced by Jim Jonsin
Albums produced by Danger Mouse (musician)
Albums produced by Mark Ronson
Albums produced by Kanye West
Albums produced by Hudson Mohawke
Albums produced by Jeff Bhasker
Albums produced by Juicy J
Albums recorded at Electric Lady Studios